Langford Budville is a village and civil parish in Somerset, England, situated near the River Tone  north-west of Wellington,  from Wiveliscombe and  west of Taunton in the Somerset West and Taunton district.  The parish includes the hamlets of Bindon, Lower Chipley, Lower Wellisford, Ramsey and Runnington.  The parish has a population of 535.

Langford Budville has a few basic facilities; like most villages it has a church (St Peter's), a public house (The Martlet), and a school (Langford Budville Church of England Primary) There is also a hotel.

History
The parishes of Langford Budville and Runnington were part of the Milverton Hundred,

In the 1830s the Grand Western Canal was built which included the construction of Harpford Bridge at Langford Budville; a new warehouse was also built.

Places of interest
Bindon House has 17th-century origins but received a new front in the 19th century. Around 1865 the west wing and entrance porch were added, and around 1880 the Flemish gables and east wing were added. The east wing was demolished in the 1930s. The porch gable end of the south front has square pilasters with a crest of the Warre family. The property was purchased by Henry Warre in 1862, having previously been tenanted by relatives of Spencer Perceval, the Prime Minister murdered in 1812.

The church of St Peter dates from the 15th century and has been designated by English Heritage as a Grade I listed building. Until 1863 Langford Budville was a chapelry of Milverton, and in 1930 Runnington was united with the benefice. The small Church of St Peter and St Paul at Runnington is of a similar age.

The cloth finishing works at Tone Mill is included in the Heritage at Risk Register produced by English Heritage.

Nearby is the Langford Heathfield Site of Special Scientific Interest.

Governance
The parish council has responsibility for local issues, including setting an annual precept (local rate) to cover the council's operating costs and producing annual accounts for public scrutiny. The parish council evaluates local planning applications and works with the local police, district council officers, and neighbourhood watch groups on matters of crime, security, and traffic. The parish council's role also includes initiating projects for the maintenance and repair of parish facilities, as well as consulting with the district council on the maintenance, repair, and improvement of highways, drainage, footpaths, public transport, and street cleaning. Conservation matters (including trees and listed buildings) and environmental issues are also the responsibility of the council.

The village falls within the non-metropolitan district of Somerset West and Taunton, which was established on 1 April 2019. It was previously in the district of Taunton Deane, which was formed on 1 April 1974 under the Local Government Act 1972, and part of Wellington Rural District before that. The district council is responsible for local planning and building control, local roads, council housing, environmental health, markets and fairs, refuse collection and recycling, cemeteries and crematoria, leisure services, parks, and tourism.

Somerset County Council is responsible for running the largest and most expensive local services such as education, social services, libraries, main roads, public transport, policing and fire services, Trading Standards, waste disposal and strategic planning.

It is also part of the Taunton Deane county constituency represented in the House of Commons of the Parliament of the United Kingdom. It elects one Member of Parliament (MP) by the first past the post system of election.

References
 Without Consent by  Philip Mantle and Carl Nagatis, (2002). Fortune Books,

External links

 Village website

Civil parishes in Somerset
Villages in Taunton Deane
Grand Western Canal